David Frederick Schmidt is a former Major League Baseball catcher. Schmidt was drafted by the Red Sox in the second round of the 1975 Major League Baseball Draft and played his entire career in their organization.

Sources
, or Retrosheet, or Pura Pelota

1956 births
Living people
Baseball players from Arizona
Boston Red Sox players
Bristol Red Sox players
Cal State Fullerton Titans baseball players
California State University, Fullerton alumni
Elmira Pioneers players
Major League Baseball catchers
Pawtucket Red Sox players
Sportspeople from Mesa, Arizona
Tigres de Aragua players
American expatriate baseball players in Venezuela
Winston-Salem Red Sox players
Winter Haven Red Sox players